Jan Wejher (1580–1626) was a Polish nobleman, son of Ernest Wejher and Anna Mortęska. He held many offices and was an officer of the army in the Polish–Lithuanian Commonwealth and a courtier of the Polish king Sigismund III from the age of thirteen.

Military service and political activity

Wejher accompanied the King in his campaign to crush the rebellion of Duke Charles in Sweden. He fought in the victorious Battle of Stegeborg and was wounded in the Battle of Stångebro. He helped defend Gdańsk from the Swedes in their raids in the early 17th century. From 1609 he was engaged in the Polish–Muscovite War.

He was a Voivode of Malbork and Chełmno.

Personal life
Wejher married to Anna Szczawińska, the daughter of the starost of Mirachowo; they had five sons and three daughters:

Sons:
Jakub Wejher
Ludwik Wejher
Jan Wejher (the younger)
Karol Wejher
Mikołaj Wejher

Daughters:
Zofia Potulicka
Elżbieta Massalska
Zuzanna Wejher (entered a monastery)

References 

Secular senators of the Polish–Lithuanian Commonwealth
1580 births
1626 deaths
People from Royal Prussia
16th-century Polish nobility
Polish people of the Polish–Muscovite War (1605–1618)
17th-century Polish nobility
Jan